The Grand Poubara Dam is a gravity dam on the Ogooué River, about  south of Franceville in Gabon. The primary purpose of the dam is hydroelectric power generation, and it supports a  power station.

History
The government of Gabon signed a $84 million loan with China in 2008 to finance the construction of the dam. The goal was to develop an alternative power source to the Kongou Falls Dam for the iron ore extraction sites also operated by the Chinese in Belinga.

Construction on the project began in November 2008, the river was diverted in November 2010, and the power station was commissioned on 5 August 2013. The dam diverts the river around the Poubara Falls where four  Francis turbine-generators are powered. The majority of the dam and power station was funded by the Chinese government and the project was constructed by Sinohydro.

Starting in 2015, the Grand Poubara Dam powers Moanda's Metallurgical Complex, the country's first manganese-processing plant.

References

Dams completed in 2013
Energy infrastructure completed in 2013
Dams in Gabon
Gravity dams
Hydroelectric power stations in Gabon
Haut-Ogooué Province
Roller-compacted concrete dams